Gaurotes otome is a species of beetle in the family Cerambycidae. It was described by Ohbayashi in 1959.

References

Lepturinae
Beetles described in 1959